Sir Kenelm Digby (1603–1665) was an English courtier, diplomat and Roman Catholic intellectual.

Kenelm Digby may also refer to:

Kenelm Digby (Rutland MP) (died 1590), English MP and High Sheriff
Kenelm Henry Digby (c. 1800–1880), Anglo-Irish writer
Kenelm Edward Digby (1836–1916), English lawyer and civil servant
Kenelm Thomas Digby (1840–1893), Member of Parliament for Queen's County, 1868–1880
Kenelm Hutchinson Digby (1884–1954), Emeritus Professor of Surgery, University of Hong Kong
Kenelm George Digby (1890–1944), Puisne Judge of the High Court of Judicature at Nagpur, India
Kenelm Simon Wingfield Digby (1910–1998), British Conservative politician
Kenelm Hubert Digby (1912–2001), proposer of the notorious 1933 "King and Country" debate and later Attorney General and judge in Sarawak and civil servant in New Zealand